Devyatkino is a locality near Saint Petersburg, Russia, and may refer to:

 Novoye Devyatkino (New Devyatkino) (Новое Девяткино) town in Novodevyatkinskogo rural settlement, Vsevolozhsky District
 Devyatkino (St. Petersburg Metro)
 Devyatkino (railroad station)
 Devyatkino (bus terminal)